The Threat From the Sea is a series of fantasy novels written mostly by Mel Odom. It contains three novels: Rising Tide, Under Fallen Stars, and The Sea Devil's Eye.  It also contains the anthology book, Realms of the Deep.

Publication history
The Threat from the Sea was written by Mel Odom, and consists of the novels Rising Tide, Under Fallen Stars and The Sea Devil's Eye. The series was later released in April 2009 as a trade paperback.

Plot synopsis
The series tells the tale of the world beneath the oceans rising up to attack the surface world. The series takes place between the Forgotten Realms years of 1354, the Year of the Bow and 1369, the Year of the Gauntlet.

Background
Author Mel Odom intended the Threat from the Sea trilogy to have major implications for the Forgotten Realms setting: "Basically, an evil that has been buried for thousands of years has risen from the sea and turned against the surface world. A lot happens in these books, and the map of Toril will not be the same afterward. A lot of people are going to be shocked and amazed." Dungeons & Dragons game sourcebook tie-ins were planned to coincide with the novels, allowing players to follow the events of the trilogy in their own campaigns.

Rising Tide was released exactly eleven years since Odom's first book sale.

Works included

 Rising Tide (1999)
 Under Fallen Stars (1999)
 The Sea Devil's Eye (2000)
 Realms of the Deep (2000)

References

Fantasy novel series
Forgotten Realms novel series
Novels by Mel Odom